"I'll Be Good to You" is a 1976 hit song by R&B duo the Brothers Johnson. George Johnson, one of the two Johnson brothers in the band, wrote the song after deciding to commit to a relationship with one woman, instead of dating several at a time. While George was recording a demo for the song, family friend Senora Sam came by and added some lyrics. Brothers Johnson producer and mentor Quincy Jones heard the song, liked it, and convinced George to sing lead on the finished track. Released from their debut album, Look Out for #1, it was a top-ten hit on the Billboard Hot Singles Charts, peaking at number three, and a number one song on the Billboard R&B Charts during the summer of 1976. The single was later certified gold by the RIAA.

Thirteen years later in 1989, it became a number one R&B hit again, with Chaka Khan and Ray Charles doing the lead vocals on Quincy Jones' Back on the Block album, and went to number eighteen on the Billboard Hot 100 Singles chart.  It also topped the American dance chart in early 1990. This was Ray Charles' first No. 1 R&B hit in twenty-four years.

Chart performance

The Brothers Johnson version

Weekly charts

Year-end charts

Quincy Jones featuring Ray Charles and Chaka Khan version

Personnel 
 Ray Charles, Chaka Khan: lead vocals featured rap artist on remix Kyle "Magic" Jackson
 Quincy Jones: producer, vocal and rhythm arranger
 David Paich, Greg Phillinganes, Ian Prince: keyboards
 Louis Johnson: Moog synthesizer bass, Fender slap bass, background vocals
 Ian Underwood, Larry Williams, Michael Boddicker, Steve Porcaro: synthesizer programming
 Bruce Swedien: drum programming
 Harvey Mason: hi-hat, cymbals
 George Johnson: guitar, background vocals
 James Ingram, James Gilstrap, Phil Perry, Siedah Garrett, Syreeta Wright: background vocals

Cover versions
It was later covered by Vanessa Williams and James "D. Train" Williams on Vanessa's 2005 studio album Everlasting Love. 
Boney James covered the song on his 2009 studio album Send One Your Love.

References

External links

See also
 List of number-one R&B singles of 1976 (U.S.)
 List of number-one R&B singles of 1989 (U.S.)
 List of number-one dance singles of 1990 (U.S.)

1976 singles
1989 singles
The Brothers Johnson songs
Chaka Khan songs
Ray Charles songs
Quincy Jones songs
Song recordings produced by Quincy Jones
1976 songs
A&M Records singles
Qwest Records singles
Warner Records singles
Songs written by Louis Johnson (bassist)